Derek Hawkins may refer to:

 Derek Hawkins (cricketer) (1935–2010), English cricketer
 Derek Hawkins (runner) (born 1989), British distance runner